Amedeo Umberto Rita Sebastiani (born 4 September 1962), known professionally as Amadeus, is an Italian television and radio presenter.

Life and career 
Born in Ravenna, son of Sicilian parents, Sebastiani grew up in Verona. He started his career in 1979 as a deejay for a small radio station in Verona. 

In 1982, Sebastiani adopted the stage name ″Amadeus″ and started working for Radio DeeJay; he made his television debut in 1988, appearing in the Radio DeeJay spin-off DeeJay Television on Italia 1. 

During his career Amadeus hosted several high profile programmes, both for RAI and Mediaset, including  Domenica in, five editions of Festivalbar, four seasons of L'eredità, Sanremo Music Festival 2020 to 2023, L'anno che verrà, and several early evening quiz shows.

Filmography

Television

Films

References

External links

  

1962 births
Living people
Italian television presenters
Italian radio presenters
Italian radio personalities
Mass media people from Verona
People of Sicilian descent